Solsona, officially the Municipality of Solsona, is a 3rd class municipality in the province of Ilocos Norte, Philippines. According to the 2020 census, it has a population of 24,851 people.

Ascents of nearby Mount Sicapoo begin at Solsona, at the Gasgas River.

Geography

Barangays
Solsona is politically subdivided into 22 barangays. These barangays are headed by elected officials: Barangay Captain, Barangay Council, whose members are called Barangay Councilors. All are elected every three years.

Climate

Demographics

Economy

Government
Solsona, belonging to the second congressional district of the province of Ilocos Norte, is governed by a mayor designated as its local chief executive and by a municipal council as its legislative body in accordance with the Local Government Code. The mayor, vice mayor, and the councilors are elected directly by the people through an election which is being held every three years.

Elected officials

References

External links
[ Philippine Standard Geographic Code]
Philippine Census Information
Local Governance Performance Management System

Municipalities of Ilocos Norte